The 59th New York State Legislature, consisting of the New York State Senate and the New York State Assembly, met from January 5 to May 26, 1836, during the fourth year of William L. Marcy's governorship, in Albany.

Background
Under the provisions of the New York Constitution of 1821, 32 senators were elected on general tickets in eight senatorial districts for four-year terms. They were divided into four classes, and every year eight Senate seats came up for election. Assemblymen were elected countywide on general tickets to a one-year term, the whole Assembly being renewed annually.

State Senator John Sudam died on April 13, 1835; and State Senator John G. Stower resigned on September 29, 1835; leaving vacancies in the Second and Fifth District.

Canal Commissioner Michael Hoffman resigned on May 6, 1835. On May 9, the Legislature elected Heman J. Redfield to succeed Hoffman, but Redfield declined to take office. During the recess of the Legislature, Gov. Marcy appointed John Bowman to fill the vacancy temporarily.

At this time there were two political parties: the Democratic Party and the Whig Party.

Elections
The State election was held from November 2 to 4, 1835. State Senator Chauncey J. Fox (8th D.) was re-elected. Henry Floyd-Jones (1st D.), John Hunter, Ebenezer Lounsbery (both 2nd D.), James Powers (3rd D.), David Spraker (4th D.), Micah Sterling (5th D.), George Huntington (6th D.), John Beardsley (7th D.) and Assemblyman David Wager (5th D.) were also elected to the Senate. Fox was a Whig, the other nine were Democrats.

Sessions
The Legislature met for the regular session at the Old State Capitol in Albany on January 5, 1836; and adjourned on May 26.

Charles Humphrey (D) was re-elected Speaker.

Upon taking their seats in the Senate, Hunter and Lounsbery (2nd D.), and Sterling and Wager (5th D.), drew lots to decide which one of the two senators elected in each district would serve the short term, and which one the full term. Lounsbery and Wager drew the short term, and Hunter and Sterling the full term.

On January 6, Attorney General Greene C. Bronson was appointed to the New York Supreme Court.

On January 9, the Legislature confirmed Gov. Marcy's recess appointment of John Bowman as Canal Commissioner.

On January 12, the Legislature elected Congressman Samuel Beardsley to succeed Bronson as Attorney General.

On February 1, the Legislature re-elected Secretary of State John A. Dix, State Comptroller Azariah C. Flagg and State Treasurer Abraham Keyser.

On May 20, State Senator John C. Kemble resigned after accusations of fraudulent and corrupt stock trading.

On Saturday, May 21, the Senate rejected a motion to expel Isaac W. Bishop, and adjourned.

On Monday morning, May 23, at the beginning of the session, State Senators Samuel Young and Myndert Van Schaick resigned their seats, stating they would not sit together with persons who refused to expel Bishop after finding him "guilty of moral and official misconduct." About half an hour later Bishop resigned his seat too.

Later on May 23, the Legislature passed "An act authorizing the appointment of an additional acting Canal Commissioner," and on May 25, the Legislature elected William Baker to the office.

On May 23, the Legislature also re-apportioned the Senate and Assembly districts, according to the State census of 1835. Queens and Suffolk counties were transferred from the First to the Second District; Delaware County from the Second to the Third; Herkimer County from the Fifth to the Fourth; Otsego from the Sixth to the Fifth; Allegany, Cattaraugus and Livingston counties from the Eighth to the Sixth; and Cortland County from the Sixth to the Seventh. The total number of assemblymen remained 128. The new county of Chemung was apportioned one seat. Allegany, Cattaraugus, Chautauqua, Erie, Genesee, Kings, Niagara, Oswego and Steuben counties gained one seat each; New York County gained two; and Cayuga, Dutchess, Herkimer, Oneida, Otsego, Rensselaer, Saratoga, Seneca, Tioga, Tompkins, Washington and Westchester counties lost one seat each.

The Democratic state convention met on September 14 at Herkimer and nominated Gov. Marcy and Lt. Gov. Tracy for re-election; and an electoral ticket pledged to Martin Van Buren for president and Richard M. Johnson for vice president.

The Whig state convention nominated Jesse Buel for Governor, and Gamaliel H. Barstow for Lieutenant Governor; and an electoral ticket pledged to William Henry Harrison for president.

The Equal Rights Party state convention met on September 15 at Utica; Robert Townsend Jr. was Chairman. They nominated Isaac S. Smith, of Buffalo, for Governor; and Moses Jaques, of New York City, for Lieutenant Governor.

State Senate

Districts
 The First District (4 seats) consisted of Kings, New York, Queens, Richmond and Suffolk counties.
 The Second District (4 seats) consisted of Delaware, Dutchess, Orange, Putnam, Rockland, Sullivan, Ulster and Westchester counties.
 The Third District (4 seats) consisted of Albany, Columbia, Greene, Rensselaer, Schenectady and Schoharie counties.
 The Fourth District (4 seats) consisted of Clinton, Essex, Franklin, Hamilton, Montgomery, St. Lawrence, Saratoga, Warren and Washington counties.
 The Fifth District (4 seats) consisted of Herkimer, Jefferson, Lewis, Madison, Oneida and Oswego counties.
 The Sixth District (4 seats) consisted of Broome, Chenango, Cortland, Otsego, Steuben, Tioga and Tompkins counties.
 The Seventh District (4 seats) consisted of Cayuga, Onondaga, Ontario, Seneca, Wayne and Yates counties.
 The Eighth District (4 seats) consisted of Allegany, Cattaraugus, Chautauqua, Erie, Genesee, Livingston, Monroe, Niagara and Orleans counties.

Note: There are now 62 counties in the State of New York. The counties which are not mentioned in this list had not yet been established, or sufficiently organized, the area being included in one or more of the abovementioned counties.

Members
The asterisk (*) denotes members of the previous Legislature who continued in office as members of this Legislature. David Wager changed from the Assembly to the Senate.

Employees
 Clerk: John F. Bacon

State Assembly

Districts

 Albany County (3 seats)
 Allegany County (1 seat)
 Broome County (1 seat)
 Cattaraugus County (1 seat)
 Cayuga County (4 seats)
 Chautauqua County (2 seats)
 Chenango County (3 seats)
 Clinton County (1 seat)
 Columbia County (3 seats)
 Cortland County (2 seats)
 Delaware County (2 seats)
 Dutchess County (4 seats)
 Erie County (2 seats)
 Essex County (1 seat)
 Franklin County (1 seat)
 Genesee County (3 seats)
 Greene County (2 seats)
 Hamilton and Montgomery counties (3 seats)
 Herkimer County (3 seats)
 Jefferson County (3 seats)
 Kings County (1 seat)
 Lewis County (1 seat)
 Livingston County (2 seats)
 Madison County (3 seats)
 Monroe County (3 seats)
 The City and County of New York (11 seats)
 Niagara County (1 seat)
 Oneida County (5 seats)
 Onondaga County (4 seats)
 Ontario County (3 seats)
 Orange County (3 seats)
 Orleans County (1 seat)
 Oswego County (1 seat)
 Otsego County (4 seats)
 Putnam County (1 seat)
 Queens County (1 seat)
 Rensselaer County (4 seats)
 Richmond County (1 seat)
 Rockland County (1 seat)
 St. Lawrence County (2 seats)
 Saratoga County (3 seats)
 Schenectady County (1 seat)
 Schoharie County (2 seats)
 Seneca County (2 seats)
 Steuben County (2 seats)
 Suffolk County (2 seats)
 Sullivan County (1 seat)
 Tioga County (2 seats)
 Tompkins County (3 seats)
 Ulster County (2 seats)
 Warren County (1 seat)
 Washington (3 seats)
 Wayne County (2 seats)
 Westchester County (3 seats)
 Yates County (1 seat)

Note: There are now 62 counties in the State of New York. The counties which are not mentioned in this list had not yet been established, or sufficiently organized, the area being included in one or more of the abovementioned counties.

Assemblymen
The asterisk (*) denotes members of the previous Legislature who continued as members of this Legislature.

Employees
 Clerk: Philip Reynolds Jr.
 Sergeant-at-Arms: Daniel Dygert
 Doorkeeper: William Powell
 Assistant Doorkeeper: Daniel Sweatman

Notes

Sources
 The New York Civil List compiled by Franklin Benjamin Hough (Weed, Parsons and Co., 1858) [pg. 109 and 441 for Senate districts; pg. 130f for senators; pg. 148f for Assembly districts; pg. 217f for assemblymen]
 The History of Political Parties in the State of New-York, from the Ratification of the Federal Constitution to 1840 by Jabez D. Hammond (4th ed., Vol. 2, Phinney & Co., Buffalo, 1850; pg. 454 to 462)

059
1836 in New York (state)
1836 U.S. legislative sessions